Cuts is an American sitcom that aired on UPN from February 14, 2005, to May 11, 2006, and is a spinoff of another UPN series, One on One. The show was canceled when UPN and The WB networks merged to form The CW.

Premise
For years, the Barnes' family-run barber shop was a place where guys could get a haircut while socializing and discussing anything. But when his older brother Flex sells the barber shop from underneath prodigal son Kevin Barnes (played by Houston), he finds himself co-managing the shop with the new owner's spoiled daughter Tiffany Sherwood (played by Elizabeth), a rich party girl who has never worked a day in her life. Despite their differing ideas of how to make the shop a success, Kevin and Tiffany together deal with the many challenges that arise when their very opposite worlds collide. The show is set in Baltimore, Maryland.

The series is set up in the 21st and 22nd episodes of the third season of One on One titled “The Prodigal Brother” and “ Phatheadz”.

Cast

Main
 Marques Houston as Kevin Barnes, younger brother of One on One'''s Flex Washington (Flex Alexander).
 Shannon Elizabeth as Tiffany Sherwood
 Shondrella Avery as Candy Taylor, girlfriend of One on One's Duane Knox.
 Rashaan Nall as Walt Powell, Candy's former foster brother
 Edward "Grapevine" Fordham Jr. as Ace Fields
 Béatrice Rosen as Faith

Recurring
 Corbin Bernsen as Jack Sherwood, Tiffany's father, previously played by David Garrison on One on One''
 Omarion Grandberry as Darius

Episodes

Season 1 (2005)

Season 2 (2005–06)

External links
 

2000s American black sitcoms
2005 American television series debuts
2006 American television series endings
English-language television shows
UPN original programming
Television series by CBS Studios
Television shows set in Baltimore
American television spin-offs